Muğanlı is a village in the Khojavend District of Azerbaijan. The village had Azerbaijani-majority prior to their expulsion during the First Nagorno-Karabakh War.

References

External links 

Populated places in Khojavend District